Tony Ballantyne may refer to:

 Tony Ballantyne (historian) (born 1972), New Zealand historian
 Tony Ballantyne (writer) (born 1972), British science-fiction writer